The 2010 European Trophy Junior was the first and only European Trophy Junior ice hockey tournament, played between 19 August and 22 August 2010. The games were played at Löfbergs Lila Arena and Kobbs Arena, both in Karlstad, Sweden. Five games were broadcast through the Internet.

Frölunda HC won the tournament this year, beating Malmö Redhawks 5–4 in the final in a shootout.

Participating clubs 
The 2010 tournament featured 10 teams from Sweden, Finland, Austria, Norway and the Czech Republic.

Regulation round

Division CCM

Standings

Games 
August 19
 13:00, Löfbergs Lila Arena: Färjestads BK – HV71 Jönköping 4 – 3 SD (1–0, 2–1, 0–2, 1–0)
 17:00, Kobbs Arena: Malmö Redhawks – Red Bull Salzburg 4 – 2 (3–2, 0–0, 1–0)
 20:00, Löfbergs Lila Arena: HIFK – Färjestads BK 6 – 1 (1–0, 3–1, 2–0)
August 20
 09:30, Kobbs Arena: HV71 Jönköping – Malmö Redhawks 2 – 3 SD (1–1, 0–1, 1–0, 0–1)
 13:00, Kobbs Arena: Red Bull Salzburg – HIFK 2 – 3 (0–0, 0–3, 2–0)
 17:00, Löfbergs Lila Arena: Färjestads BK – Malmö Redhawks 2 – 6 (2–2, 0–1, 0–3)
 20:30, Löfbergs Lila Arena: HV71 Jönköping – Red Bull Salzburg 3 – 4 GWS (2–1, 0–0, 1–2, 0–0, 0–1)
August 21
 11:00, Löfbergs Lila Arena: Malmö Redhawks – HIFK 2 – 3 GWS (0–0, 0–1, 2–1, 0–0, 0–1)
 15:00, Löfbergs Lila Arena: Red Bull Salzburg – Färjestads BK 4 – 1 (1–0, 2–1, 1–0)
 19:30, Kobbs Arena: HIFK – HV71 Jönköping 1 – 5 (1–1, 0–3, 0–1)

Division Reebok

Standings

Games 
August 19
 13:30, Kobbs Arena: Djurgårdens IF – Frölunda HC 1 – 3 (0–2, 1–1, 0–0)
 16:30, Löfbergs Lila Arena: Linköpings HC – Norway Team 20 5 – 3 (3–0, 2–1, 0–2)
 20:30, Kobbs Arena: Karlovy Vary – Djurgårdens IF 4 – 3 (0–1, 0–2, 4–0)
August 20
 10:00, Löfbergs Lila Arena: Frölunda HC – Linköpings HC 5 – 2 (1–0, 3–0, 1–2)
 13:30, Löfbergs Lila Arena: Norway Team 20 – Karlovy Vary 3 – 6 (1–2, 1–2, 1–2)
 16:30, Kobbs Arena: Djurgårdens IF – Linköpings HC 3 – 5 (2–2, 0–2, 1–1)
 20:00, Kobbs Arena: Frölunda HC – Norway Team 20 3 – 0 (2–0, 1–0, 0–0)
August 21
 11:30, Kobbs Arena: Linköpings HC – Karlovy Vary 3 – 1 (1–1, 0–0, 2–0)
 15:30, Kobbs Arena: Norway Team 20 – Djurgårdens IF 3 – 2 GWS (0–1, 1–0, 1–1, 0–0, 1–0)
 19:00, Löfbergs Lila Arena: Karlovy Vary – Frölunda HC 3 – 4 SD (1–2, 1–1, 1–0, 0–1)

Playoffs

Games 
August 22
 08:30, Kobbs Arena, place 9–10: Färjestads BK – Djurgårdens IF 1 – 3 (0–0, 1–1, 0–2)
 09:00, Löfbergs Lila Arena, place 7–8: Red Bull Salzburg – Norway Team 20 3 – 5 (0–0, 3–3, 0–2)
 12:00, Kobbs Arena, place 5–6: Karlovy Vary – HV71 Jönköping 1 – 4 (1–3, 0–0, 0–1)
 12:30, Löfbergs Lila Arena, bronze medal game: Linköpings HC – HIFK 6 – 4 (0–3, 3–0, 3–1)
 16:00, Löfbergs Lila Arena, final: Frölunda HC – Malmö Redhawks 5 – 4 GWS (3–2, 1–1, 0–1, 0–0, 1–0)

Final standings

Tournament All-star team 
D John Klingberg Frölunda HC
D Victor Mångs Malmö Redhawks
C Joachim Nermark Linköpings HC
W Sebastian Dyk Malmö Redhawks
W Sebastian Collberg Frölunda HC

References 
 https://web.archive.org/web/20100921155642/http://europeantrophy.com/junior.php

See also 
 2010 European Trophy

European Trophy Junior
Junior, 2010
2010
Euro